Naiza can refer to: 

 Ak-Tash, Jalal-Abad
 Naiza (multiple rocket launcher)